Chinmaya International Residential School (abbreviated CIRS) is a private school located near Coimbatore in Siruvani, India, in the foothills of the Western Ghats, and encompasses a 100-acre campus.

It offers CBSE from grades 5 to 12 and IB for grades 11 to 12. The school is currently run by Mrs. Rajeshwari (Principal). The school has various facilities for various activities. It is a fully vegetarian school.

Overview
Chinmaya International Residential School (CIRS) was established by Swami Chinmayananda on June 6, 1996.

Affiliated to the Central Board of Secondary Education (CBSE),  New Delhi and the International Baccalaureate Organization (IBO),  Geneva, Switzerland, CIRS is currently headed by chairperson Swami Swaroopananda,(the global head of Global Chinmaya Mission and a direct disciple of the founder Swami Chinmayananda.  
CIRS boasts of a campus area filled with 80 acres of natural tract of flora and fauna.   

The campus was awarded the “Green School Award” by the Centre for Science and Environment,  New Delhi.   

The school started out with 96 students from Grades 5-8. Today, it has over 550 students.

References

External links

 

International schools in India
Schools affiliated with the Chinmaya Mission
Schools in Coimbatore
Boarding schools in Tamil Nadu
High schools and secondary schools in Tamil Nadu
Education in Coimbatore district
Educational institutions established in 1996
1996 establishments in Tamil Nadu